St. Albans Farms Stone Barn, also known as the Stone Dairy Barn, is a historic barn located at St. Albans, Franklin County, Missouri. It was built about 1918, and is a large "U"-shaped one-story frame building with limestone-faced walls and a steep gable roof.  It features round corner towers that are topped with conical roofs.  Associated with the barn are a large round tile silo off of each back corner.  Much of the barn has been demolished.

It was listed on the National Register of Historic Places in 2006.

References

Barns on the National Register of Historic Places in Missouri
Buildings and structures completed in 1918
Buildings and structures in Franklin County, Missouri
National Register of Historic Places in Franklin County, Missouri